Nathan Foley may refer to:

 Nathan Foley (footballer), Australian rules footballer
 Nathan Foley (singer), performer in children's group Hi-5